The 2002 Alaska gubernatorial election took place on November 5, 2002, for the post of Governor of Alaska. Republican U.S. Senator Frank Murkowski defeated Democratic Lieutenant Governor Fran Ulmer.  Murkowski became the first Republican elected governor of Alaska since Jay Hammond in 1978.

Primaries
Incumbent Democratic Governor Tony Knowles was term limited from running again. Lieutenant Governor Fran Ulmer easily won the Democratic primary on August 27 against outsiders Michael Beasley and Bruce Lemke, neither of whom did much campaigning. Meanwhile, Senator Frank Murkowski also gained an easy win in the Republican primary.

Campaign
Murkowski started the campaign as the clear favorite as Ulmer, despite being lieutenant governor, had a lot less name recognition. Polls initially showed Ulmer about 20 percent behind Murkowski but as the campaign continued Ulmer closed on Murkowski in the polls by concentrating on local issues such as the state budget and by portraying herself as a moderate. By October polls showed the candidates about level with one poll on October 17 showing Ulmer at 46% and Murkowski at 43%.

The biggest issue in the campaign was the economy and what to do about the projected budget shortfall in Alaska. The issue dominated the October debates between the two candidates in Fairbanks and Anchorage. Ulmer argued that the state should consider introducing a statewide tax for the first time since 1980 if the budget reserve fell too far and that state spending should be capped. However Murkowski opposed any new taxes and called his opponent pro-tax. He said that new oil prospects, high oil prices and revenues from other resources could close the gap in the budget.

President George Bush made an advertisement supporting Murkowski, who also received support from Republicans Gale Norton, Ted Stevens and Don Young. Ulmer received support from former Republican Governor Jay Hammond, Governor Tony Knowles and called on voters to support her so that Murkowski could stay working as Senator for Alaska in Congress. During the campaign Murkowski refused to say whom he would appoint to serve his remaining two years as U.S. senator but after the election appointed his daughter Lisa Murkowski, majority leader-elect in the Alaska House of Representatives, to fill the seat.

Predictions

Election results
U.S. Senator Frank Murkowski won the election with 55.85% of the vote, the highest percentage for any Alaska gubernatorial candidate up to that time.

References

2002
Alaska
Governor